The 1926–27 Ljubljana Subassociation League was the eight season of the Ljubljana Subassociation League. Ilirija won the league for the eight season in a row, defeating Rapid 4–3 in the final.

Celje subdivision

Ljubljana subdivision

Maribor subdivision

Semi-final

Final

References

External links
Football Association of Slovenia 

Slovenian Republic Football League seasons
Yugo
Slovenia
Football
Football